Hopedale is a census-designated place (CDP) comprising the main village in the town of Hopedale, Worcester County, Massachusetts, United States. As of the 2010 census, it had a population of 3,753, out of 5,911 in the entire town of Hopedale.

It is bordered to the northeast by the town of Milford and to the southwest by the town of Mendon. Massachusetts Route 16 passes through the community, leading northeast  to the center of Milford and southwest  to Uxbridge.

Demographics

References 

Census-designated places in Worcester County, Massachusetts
Census-designated places in Massachusetts